Grazina Frame (born Lydia Anna Grazina Obrycha; 6 November 1941, Fylde, Lancashire, England) is an English stage and screen actress, singer and voice double

Early life
Grazina Frame was born as Lydia Anna Grazina Obrycha to Polish parents Zena Frame (mother) and Karol Jan Obrycki (father). She attended the Aida Foster Drama School and began her career as Grazina Obrycki.

Television
She first appeared on television as a servant girl in A Time to be Born, a Christmas play, for BBC Television (24 December 1953).

On television, she appeared as entertainer Gloria Marsh in the 19 October 1969 episode of Randall and Hopkirk (Deceased) "That's How Murder Snowballs", and in series Up Pompeii! (1970), The Fenn Street Gang (1971), Doctor in Charge (1972) and The Morecambe and Wise Show as a regular from 1971 to 1974, playing supporting roles to the legendary comedians. Her latest screen appearance was in the 1996 television movie Cuts.

Stage
She appeared as Mavis, a Victorian Mermaid, in Follow That Girl, 1959–1960, at Vaudeville Theatre, London.

She appeared as Carol Blitztein, in Blitz!, the 1962 West End musical by Lionel Bart.

She appeared in the 1986 London production of Cabaret with Wayne Sleep, Kelly Hunter, Peter Land, and Rodney Cottam.

Music
She recorded a series of singles as Grazina for HMV 1962-1964, and sang with Sir Cliff Richard on several 1960s songs, as a result of having over-dubbed both Carole Gray in film The Young Ones and Lauri Peters in Summer Holiday.

Film
Her film appearances include The Painted Smile (1962), What a Crazy World (1963),  The Bargee  (1964), Every Day's a Holiday (1965) and The Alphabet Murders (1965).

Personal life
She was married to songwriter and record producer Mitch Murray until 1980, with daughters Mazz and Gina, who would form the girl group Woman. Grazina remarried to writer-producer Rob Dallas. She was a friend of the late Bob Monkhouse.

Discography

As Grazina 
 A: "Lover Please Believe Me" / B: "So What"
 A: "Another Like You" / B: "Don't Be Shy"
 A: "Be My Baby" / B: "I Ain't Gonna Knock On Your Door"
 A: "Stay Awhile" / B: "Let Me Go Lover"

With Cliff Richard 
 "Nothing's Impossible" (Cliff Richard and Grazina Frame, A.B.S Orchestra) The Young Ones
 "No One For Me" (Grazina Frame, A.B.S Orchestra) The Young Ones
 "A Swinging Affair" (Grazina Frame, A.B.S. Orchestra) Summer Holiday

Television
 List of The Morecambe & Wise Show (1968–1977) episodes
 Up Pompeii!
 That's How Murder Snowballs

References

External links
 
 
 

Living people
1941 births